Alicia Gräfin (Countess) von Rittberg (born 10 December 1993) is a German actress. Following numerous roles in German films and television series, she came to attention outside Germany for her brief role as Emma in the 2014 film Fury. Rittberg starred as Ida Lenze in the lead role in the German TV series Charité for which she received the Bambi Award in 2017. In 2022, she starred as Elizabeth Tudor in the historical drama Becoming Elizabeth.

Early life 
She attended a humanities-oriented Gymnasium. She studied corporate management and economics at Zeppelin University in Friedrichshafen, where she was due to complete her bachelor's degree thesis in June 2017.

Career 
She began her film career, as a student, from 2000 onward. 

For her starring role as a foster child in the 2012 ZDF TV film And all were silent, she received the 2013 Young Artist Award at the Bavarian Television Award.

In 2014, she co-starred as Emma alongside Brad Pitt, Logan Lerman and Shia LaBeouf in the American war film Fury, directed by David Ayer. She appeared in Our Kind of Traitor, a 2016 spy thriller film directed by Susanna White. She played the lead role of Ida Lenze in season 1 of the German TV series Charité for which she received the Bambi Award in the category of German actress in 2017. In 2022, she starred as Elizabeth Tudor in the historical drama Becoming Elizabeth.

Filmography

Film

Television

Accolades

References

External links
 
 Profile on the Agency's website die agenten 
 http://www.filmportal.de/person/alicia-von-rittberg_64ead08386574bd184fade1219962e8f
 

Living people
German film actresses
German television actresses
Actresses from Munich
21st-century German actresses
1993 births
German countesses